Fred W. Riggs (July 3, 1917 in India – February 9, 2008 in USA) was a political scientist and pioneer Public Administration, especially his Riggsian Model. He was Professor Emeritus at Political Science Department of University of Hawaii.

Awards 
 Dwight Waldo award for lifetime achievements in Public Administration, American Society for Public Administration, April 1991.
 Order of White Elephant, conferred by King of Thailand, in Bangkok, 1986.
 First non-Asian to be honored by Eastern Regional Organization for Public Administration, EROPA Conference, Seoul, Korea, 1983.
 Fellow, Center for Advanced Study in the Behavioral Sciences, Stanford, 1966–67.
 Senior Specialist, East-West Center, University of Hawaii, 1962–1963.
 Fellow, Committee on Comparative Politics of the Social Science Research Institute, for field research in Thailand, 1957–58.

References 

Public administration scholars
1917 births
2008 deaths
University of Hawaiʻi faculty
Political science writers
American political scientists
American expatriates in China
20th-century political scientists